Otey is an unincorporated community located in northwestern Brazoria County, Texas, United States. According to the Handbook of Texas, the community had a population of 318 in 2000. It is located within the Greater Houston metropolitan area.

History
Otey was the site of the Palo Alto plantation owned by Robert and David G. Mills. They operated several other plantations in the state and have been said to have had $5 million before the American Civil War. They were soon bankrupted during the reconstruction era and lost their plantations to other creditors. The land surrounding the Palo Alto plantation and other plantations were within the boundaries of the Ramsey Unit, a Texas Department of Criminal Justice prison. It became a prison for recidivists over 25 years of age, starting in 1908. A post office was established at Otey in 1911 and remained in operation until 1973 when mail was transferred to Rosharon. Its population in 1914 was 700 and had a physician. The Ramsey Unit had 674 inmates during that time. The Sugar Land Railroad extended its track from Anchor to Otey in 1916 and has since been abandoned. Its population dropped to 150 in 1958. It grew to 318 from 1990 through 2000. The Ramsey Unit prison had agricultural operations for crops, livestock, a dairy, a dehydrator, a gin, and furniture refurbishment.

Geography
Otey, on Oyster Creek, is on the westernmost extension of Farm to Market Road 655.

Education
Angleton Independent School District operates schools in the area.

Gallery

References

Unincorporated communities in Brazoria County, Texas
Unincorporated communities in Texas